The Kołos Medal (Polish: Medal im. Włodzimierza Kołosa) is a prestigious medal awarded every two years by the University of Warsaw and the Polish Chemical Society for distinction in theoretical or experimental physical chemistry. It was established in 1998 to commemorate the life and career of Włodzimierz Kołos, one of the founding fathers of modern quantum chemistry.

The medal features the picture of Kołos, his date of birth and death, the Latin inscriptions Societas Chimica Polonorum, Universitas Varsoviensis and Servire Veritatis Kołos Lectio Praemiumque as well as the name of the recipient.

Recipients
The winners of the award so far have been:

Source: Warsaw University

See also

 List of chemistry awards

References

External links 
 Kołos Medal page

Chemistry awards
Polish awards
Polish science and technology awards
Awards established in 1998